Man on the Flying Trapeze (UK title: The Memory Expert) is a 1935 comedy film starring W. C. Fields as a henpecked husband who experiences a series of misadventures while taking a day off from work to attend a wrestling match. As with his other roles of this nature, Fields is put-upon throughout the film, but triumphs in the end.

Plot
Ambrose Wolfinger works as a "memory expert" for a manufacturing company's president. He keeps track of details about the clients President Malloy (Oscar Apfel) meets with, so that Malloy will never be embarrassed about not remembering things when meeting with them. But Ambrose doesn't keep files; all the documents are a huge mess of paper piled on his desk. Ambrose supports himself, his shrewish wife Leona (Kathleen Howard), his loving daughter Hope (from a previous marriage; played by Mary Brian), his freeloading brother-in-law Claude (Grady Sutton), and his abusive, sternly teetotal mother-in-law Cordelia (Vera Lewis).

At the start of the film, two burglars, played by Tammany Young and Walter Brennan, break into Ambrose's cellar after midnight, get drunk on his homemade applejack, and start singing "On the Banks of the Wabash, Far Away". Ambrose is forced to handle the situation, and he winds up being arrested for distilling liquor without a license. While on the way to the night court Ambrose talks about the big wrestling match scheduled for that day, for which he has a front-row ticket.

After Hope pays his bail, Ambrose returns home in time to have breakfast before reporting for work. He asks Malloy for the afternoon off, falsely claiming that Cordelia has died and her funeral is that day. He begins explaining that she was taken with a "chill" and that he poured her a drink. His story is interrupted by Malloy, who misconstrues it as a case of death from poisoned liquor, and Ambrose is too timid to contradict him. Malloy lets him go for the day. Ambrose's supervisor, Mr. Peabody (Lucien Littlefield), tells his department the tragic news so they can send condolences, and also notifies the newspaper.

Ambrose has a series of misfortunes on his way to the wrestling match: He has encounters with ticket-writing policemen, he has a flat tire, and he is nearly hit by a train while chasing a runaway tire. Finally, while trying to get into the wrestling arena (Claude had stolen his ticket earlier), he gets knocked down by a wrestler who is thrown out of the building by his opponent. As spectators exit the arena, Claude sees Ambrose sprawled on the sidewalk and sees Ambrose's secretary, who had attended the wrestling match separately, bent over him expressing concern over his injury.

Meanwhile, a huge number of flowers, sympathy cards, and funeral wreaths are delivered to the Wolfinger home. This puzzles Cordelia and Leona, and when they see Cordelia's obituary in the newspaper—under the headline "Aged Woman Victim of Poisoned Alcohol"—they are furious, and quickly fix the blame on Ambrose. Ambrose returns home to a harsh reception. He confesses to deceiving his boss, but when Claude announces that he saw Ambrose and the secretary "drunk in the gutter", Ambrose, who has been meek through the entire film, finally has had enough. He knocks Claude unconscious, and frightens his wife and mother-in-law into hiding. He and his daughter leave the house to go live elsewhere.

Peabody has fired Ambrose, but Malloy demands that Peabody rehire him because no one else can figure out Wolfinger's filing system. Hope answers the telephone call from Peabody, and says (falsely) that Ambrose has a better offer from another company. After some bargaining, Ambrose is rehired with a huge raise in pay and four weeks' vacation. Meanwhile, Leona realizes that she still loves Ambrose, scolds Claude for his laziness, and stands up to her disagreeable mother.

The film ends with Ambrose taking the family for a ride in his new car. Hope and Leona ride inside the car with him, while Claude and Cordelia ride in the open rumble seat during a heavy rain.

Cast

W. C. Fields as Ambrose Wolfinger
Kathleen Howard as Leona Wolfinger, his wife
Mary Brian as Hope Wolfinger, his daughter
Vera Lewis as Mrs. Cordelia Neselrode, mother-in-law
Grady Sutton as Claude Neselrode, her son
Tammany Young as 'Willie' the Weasel, a burglar
Walter Brennan as 'Legs' Garnett, a burglar
Lew Kelly as Adolph Berg
Arthur Aylesworth as Night Court Judge
 Michael Visaroff as Homicidal Maniac in Cell 
Oscar Apfel as Mr. Malloy, President of Company
Lucien Littlefield as Mr. Peabody, Office Manager
Carlotta Monti as "Ambrose's Secretary"
Patrick H. O'Malley, Jr. as Police Officer
 James Flavin as Henry, chauffeur  
 Joe Sawyer as Ambulance Driver
 Minerva Urecal as Italian Woman in Ambulance
 Eddy Chandler as Motorcycle Policeman 
 Edward Gargan as Patrolman #1
 James Burke as Patrolman #2
Tor Johnson as Tosoff, the 'Mad Russian', a wrestler
 Harry Ekezian as Hookalakah Meshobbab, a wrestler
 Sam Lufkin as Ticket Taker 
 Billy Bletcher as Timekeeper
 George B. French as Clerk
 Rosemary Theby as Helpful Passerby

Reception
Writing for The Spectator, Graham Greene characterized the film as "a slow worthy comedy". The movie's reputation has grown over time. Waxing more enthusiastic than Greene, film critic Danny Peary declared in 1993 that this was nothing less than Fields's best performance. "In contrast to his other roles," Peary wrote, "Fields isn't cantankerous, doesn't bully any imbecilic assistants, swindle anyone, or do a whole lot of bragging... But don't worry, as his nicest guy, Fields is still in peak form." Noting that Ambrose Wolfinger is still "a rebel and nonconformist" despite his kindness, Peary adds, "It's a pleasure to watch Fields stumble through life and emerge, impossibly, unscathed." Peary concludes by awarding Fields his "alternate" 1935 Academy Award for Best Actor: "For playing a marvelous character no other comic could conceive, and making us laugh nonstop for 65 minutes, Fields deserves the Oscar."

Notes

References

External links

 
 

1935 films
1935 comedy films
American comedy films
American black-and-white films
Films directed by Clyde Bruckman
Films directed by W. C. Fields
Paramount Pictures films
1930s American films